Stadionul Uricani is a multi-use stadium in Uricani, Romania. It is used mostly for football matches and is the home ground of Știința Miroslava. The stadium holds 1,000 people.

References

Football venues in Romania
Buildings and structures in Iași County
Sport in Iași County